Cry for Happy is a 1961 American CinemaScope comedy film directed by George Marshall and starring Glenn Ford and Donald O'Connor. It is a service comedy set in Japan and largely filmed there. The title song is sung during the opening credits by Miyoshi Umeki, who has a major role in the movie.

Plot
During the Korean War, Andy Cyphers (Glenn Ford), a Navy photographer and his three-man team occupy a Tokyo geisha house, though it is off-limits and four girls are living there.

At first, the men misunderstand the geishas' occupation. Later, romance develops. Complications ensue when a tongue-in-cheek remark made to the press by Cyphers saying he was fighting in the Korean War to help Japanese orphans gets publicity in the United States, and the Navy starts to look into the situation. The sailors and the geishas decide to quickly convert the geisha house into a temporary orphanage with local children agreeing to pose as orphans in exchange for ice cream. Surprisingly, the ruse is successful and thousands of Americans donate money, leading to Cyphers establishing a legitimate orphanage. A double wedding is held between two of the sailors and two of the geishas, while the other two men consider following suit.

Cast
 Glenn Ford as CPO Andy Cyphers
 Donald O'Connor as Murray Prince
 Miiko Taka as Chiyoko
 James Shigeta as Suzuki
 Miyoshi Umeki as Harue
 Michi Kobi as Hanakichi
 Howard St. John as Vice Adm. Admiral B. Bennett
 Joe Flynn as MacIntosh
 Chet Douglas as Lank
 Tsuruko Kobayashi as Koyuki
 Harriet E. MacGibbon as Mrs. Bennett
 Robert Kino as Mr. Endo
 Bob Okazaki as Izumi
 Harlan Warde as Chaplain
 Nancy Kovack as Camile Cameron
 Ted Knight as Lt. Glick
 Bill Quinn as Alan Lyman
 Ciyo Nakasone as Keiko

Reception
Reviews from critics were mixed to negative; one commonly noted aspect of the film was the bawdiness of the humor which pushed the limits of what was permitted on the screen at the time. Bosley Crowther of The New York Times wrote that "a great deal of nonsense" took place in the film—"nonsense of the sort that betokens a desperate scriptwriter at work ... Don't be surprised, indeed, at anything that happens in this knockabout film, derived from a novel by George Campbell, which must have been better, at least. And don't be disappointed, since you have been solemnly warned." Variety called the film a "disappointment," with humor that was "uneven and largely low, exaggerated or obvious, and the stars have little to sink their thespic teeth into." Harrison's Reports rated the film, "Good," with "some of the raciest lines we've heard yet in the new 'adult' wave of American films. This approach to burlesque comedy is going to bring new cries from censors and those demanding that pictures here be classified." Roger Angell of The New Yorker called the film an "irritating work, which made me want to cry, all right, but not for happy." Charles Stinson of the Los Angeles Times called the film "a moderately amusing effort — even if you've seen all its gags three dozen times before, which you certainly have." Stinson added that the one thing which distinguished Cry for Happy from the many other service comedies was Irving Brecher's dialogue, which was "professionally trim and bright but he could not resist lacing it with some of the stiffest shots of double-entendre heard on screen in a long time. Half a dozen lines are more than risque and at least one is far too raw even for a service comedy. This is enough to mark this film off the family list." The Monthly Film Bulletin wrote, "Any film which expends most of its energies on a protracted joke about how far you can go with a geisha could hardly fail to be as charmless and witless as this."

See also
 List of American films of 1961

References

External links
 
 
 
 

1961 films
Columbia Pictures films
Films directed by George Marshall
1961 comedy films
Korean War films
Films about geisha
American comedy films
Films based on American novels
Films with screenplays by Irving Brecher
Films set in Japan
Films scored by George Duning
Japan in non-Japanese culture
1960s English-language films
1960s American films